Dale Walters (born June 21, 1961) is a former American football player. Dale Walters was named to USFL'S All Rookie Team during 1984. He was one of the Gamblers punters. He punted in all 18 games for the Gamblers in 1984.  Dale Walters was also a member of the 1995 and 1997 USSSA Supreme Softball All-Star Team, earning Honorable Mention both times.

References
Houston Gamblers

External links
Just Sports Stats
National Softball Teams of Honor

Living people
1961 births
Players of American football from Kansas
American football punters
Rice Owls football players
Houston Gamblers players
Cleveland Browns players
People from Lane County, Kansas